Meiotic recombination protein REC8 homolog is a protein that in humans is encoded by the REC8 gene.

Rec8 is a meiosis-specific component of the cohesin complex that binds sister chromatids in preparation for the two divisions of meiosis. Rec8 is sequentially removed from sister chromatids. It is removed from the arms of chromosomes in the first division - separating homologous chromosomes from each other. However, Rec8 is maintained at centromeres so that sister chromatids are kept joined until anaphase of meiosis II, at which point removal of remaining cohesin leads to the separation of sister chromatids.

Function 

This gene encodes a member of the kleisin family of SMC (structural maintenance of chromosome) protein partners. The protein localizes to the axial elements of chromosomes during meiosis in both oocytes and spermatocytes. REC8 protein appears to participate with other cohesins STAG3, SMC1ß and SMC3 in sister chromatid cohesion throughout the whole meiotic process in human oocytes.  In the mouse, the homologous protein is a key component of the meiotic cohesion complex, which regulates sister chromatid cohesion and recombination between homologous chromosomes. Multiple alternatively spliced variants, encoding the same protein, have been found for this gene.

Rec8 remains in complex with SMC proteins until anaphase, where it is degraded by Separase once the spindle assembly checkpoint is bypassed. Unlike the other Kleisin family member, Scc1, Rec8 must be phosphorylated prior to degradation. Prior to anaphase, Rec8 is protected from phosphorylation by Protein Phosphatase 2 (PP2A-B56) in mouse.  PP2A is recruited to cohesin by Shugoshin 2 (Sgo2; SGOL2 in yeast). Bypass of the spindle assembly checkpoint activates Separase, which then degrades phosphorylated Rec8 and untethers Cohesin from sister chromatids, allowing for segregation of chromosomes.

Interactions 

REC8 has been shown to interact with SMC3.

References

Further reading